Newtown Elementary School, in what is now Johns Creek, Georgia, was built in 1929.  It was listed on the National Register of Historic Places in August 2006.

History 

The school was deemed significant as "a good example of an elementary school built with minimal details or embellishments, just a functioning four-room school building with central assembly room," built in a rural area just before the Great Depression. It originally had pot-bellied stoves and outdoor privies.

It replaced four separate one-room schoolhouses in what was then Milton County, Georgia, as the last school built in the county, before Milton was merged in 1931 into Fulton County for financial reasons including the economic effects of the boll weevil.  The property includes two contributing buildings besides the school:  a storage shed and a community building.  Its main building is H-shaped.

It is the sole historic place in Johns Creek which is listed on the National Register of Historic Places. It was listed with location being in unincorporated area of Fulton County, near Alpharetta.  Later in the listing year of 2006, Johns Creek was officially incorporated as a city.

See also
National Register of Historic Places listings in Fulton County, Georgia

Notes

References

Johns Creek, Georgia
Buildings and structures completed in 1929
National Register of Historic Places in Fulton County, Georgia
Schools in Georgia (U.S. state)